Mischke is a surname. Notable people with the surname include:
Anja Mischke (born 1967), German speed skater
Frank Mischke (born 1961), German footballer
T. D. Mischke (born 1962), American writer, musician, podcaster, and former radio talk show host

English-language surnames